Spinetta Marengo is a town in Piedmont, Italy located within the municipal boundaries of the comune of Alessandria. The population is 6,417.

On 14 June 1800 the village was the scene of an important battle between the French army commanded by Napoleon and an Austrian army led by Melas. Every second Sunday in June, there is traditionally a costumed commemoration of the battle, drawing many international visitors.

The famous dish Chicken Marengo is named after the town. According to legend, Napoleon's chef created the dish from the few ingredients he could find after the battle, using a sabre instead of a cooking knife.

Museum
A museum about the battle is today housed in the Villa Delavo, inaugurated in 1847 and built by Antonio Delavo. In this museum you can see mural paintings, videos, maps, mannequins in vintage uniforms, and other objects related to Napoleon or the battle of Marengo.

A pyramid which became the symbol of the museum was also inaugurated in May 2009. 200 years later, it echoes the wish of Napoleon to build a pyramid in honor of those who died at the battle in 1800.

The Marengo treasure
In 1928, precious objects from the Roman period were uncovered by farmers in a field near the village of Marengo. Dating from the second century, the objects, all in very bad condition, included a silver bust representing the emperor Lucius Verus and a silver vase decorated with acanthus leaves. The objects today are conserved in the Museum of Antiquity of Turin, awaiting restoration.

See also
Marengo (color)
Marengo (horse)

References

External links

Cities and towns in Piedmont
Frazioni of the Province of Alessandria
Alessandria